We Go Fast is a 1941 American comedy action film directed by William C. McGann and written by Thomas Lennon and Adrian Scott. The film stars Lynn Bari, Alan Curtis, Sheila Ryan, Don DeFore, Ernest Truex and Gerald Mohr. The film was released on September 19, 1941, by 20th Century Fox.

Plot

With his attention held by waitress Rose Coughlin, police officer Herman Huff nearly lets a thief get away until customer Bob Brandon saves the day. Bob decides to become a motorcycle cop like Herman and they end up partners, as well as rivals for Rose.

When the arrogant Diana Hempstead is pulled over by Herman for speeding, she uses her wealthy father's clout to get out of the ticket. And when a visiting dignitary, the Nabob, is being guarded by Herman and Bob, the boys are disappointed in Rose's interest in him. Then everybody's embarrassed when the Nabob turns out to be a fake.

Herman and Bob eventually gain the upper hand, even making sure Diana pays for her reckless driving. And while they continue arguing, Rose agrees to date one man one night, the other the next.

Cast   
Lynn Bari as Rose Coughlin
Alan Curtis as Bob Brandon
Sheila Ryan as Diana Hempstead
Don DeFore as Herman Huff 
Ernest Truex as Harold Bruggins
Gerald Mohr as Nabob of Borria
George Lessey as J.P. Hempstead
Paul McGrath as Carberry
Tom Dugan as Jonathan Doremus Dimwitt 
Arthur Hohl as Hold-Up Man
James Flavin as Police Lt. Bardette
Arthur Loft as Francis X. 'Frank' Futter
Charles Arnt as Refrigerator Salesman
Ruth Clifford as Mrs. Kertz 
Dot Farley as Hempstead's Cook
Charles Trowbridge as Defense Attorney

References

External links 
 

1941 films
20th Century Fox films
American action comedy films
1940s action comedy films
Films directed by William C. McGann
American black-and-white films
1941 comedy films
1940s English-language films
1940s American films